Oracle Developer Studio, formerly named Oracle Solaris Studio, Sun Studio, Sun WorkShop, Forte Developer, and SunPro Compilers, is Oracle Corporation's flagship software development product for the Solaris and Linux operating systems. It includes optimizing C, C++, and Fortran compilers, libraries, and performance analysis and debugging tools, for Solaris on SPARC and x86 platforms, and Linux on x86/x64 platforms, including multi-core systems.

Oracle Developer Studio is downloadable and usable at no charge; however, there are many security and functionality patch updates which are only available with a support contract from Oracle.

Version 12.4 adds partial support for the C++11 language standard. All C++11 features are supported except for concurrency and atomic operations, and user-defined literals. Version 12.6 supports the C++14 language standard.

Languages
 C
 C++
 Fortran

Supported architectures
 SPARC
 i86pc (x86 and x86-64)

Components 
The Oracle Developer software suite includes:
 C, C++, and Fortran compilers and support libraries
 dbx and frontends
 lint
 A NetBeans-based IDE
 Performance Analyzer
 Thread analyzer
 Sun performance library
 Distributed make

Compiler optimizations 

A common optimizing backend is used for code generation.

A high-level intermediate representation called Sun IR is used, and high-level optimizations done in the iropt (intermediate representation optimizer) component are operated at the Sun IR level. Major optimizations include:

 Copy propagation
 Constant folding and constant propagation
 Dead code elimination
 Interprocedural optimization analysis
 Loop optimizations
 Automatic parallelization
 Profile-guided optimization
 Scalar replacement
 Strength reduction
 Automatic vectorization, with -xvector=simd

OpenMP
The OpenMP shared memory parallelization API is native to all three compilers.

Code coverage

Tcov, a source code coverage analysis and statement-by-statement profiling tool, comes as a standard utility. Tcov generates exact counts of the number of times each statement in a program is executed and annotates source code to add instrumentation.

The tcov utility gives information on how often a program executes segments of code. It produces a copy of the source file, annotated with execution frequencies. The code can be annotated at the basic block level or the source line level. As the statements in a basic block are executed the same number of times, a count of basic block executions equals the number of times each statement in the block is executed. The tcov utility does not produce any time-based data.

GCCFSS
The GCC for SPARC Systems (GCCFSS) compiler uses GNU Compiler Collection's (GCC) front end with the Oracle Developer Studio compiler's code-generating back end. Thus, GCCFSS is able to handle GCC-specific compiler directives, while it is also able to take advantage of the compiler optimizations in the compiler's back end. This greatly facilitates the porting of GCC-based applications to SPARC systems.

GCCFSS 4.2 adds the ability to be used as a cross compiler; SPARC binaries can be generated on an x86 (or x64) machine running Solaris.

Research platform
Before its cancellation, the Rock would have been the first general-purpose processor to support hardware transactional memory (HTM). The Oracle Developer Studio compiler is used by a number of research projects, including Hybrid Transactional Memory (HyTM) and Phased Transactional Memory (PhTM), to investigate support and possible HTM optimizations.

History

– Source:

References

External links
 Oracle Developer Studio home page on Oracle Developer Network
 Product documentation
 Cool Tools - GCC for SPARC Systems
 Oracle Studio Forums
 Application Performance Tuning on Sun Platform (archived Jan 29, 2008)
 Download Oracle Developer Studio
 Oracle Developer Studio Component Matrix

Sun Microsystems software
C++ compilers
C (programming language) compilers
Fortran compilers
compilers and interpreters
computer libraries